Clement Gazzam Hurd (January 12, 1908 – February 5, 1988) was an American artist. He is known for illustrations of children's picture books, especially collaborations with writer Margaret Wise Brown including Goodnight Moon (1947) and The Runaway Bunny (1942).

Biography

Early life
Hurd was born in New York City to Richard Melancthon Hurd, an economist and mortgage banker, and Lucy Gazzam Hurd. He was educated at St. Paul's School in Concord, New Hampshire, then studied architecture at Yale University and painting with Fernand Léger in Paris.

Career
Hurd returned to New York in 1933 to work as a commercial artist. There Margaret Wise Brown was an editor at W. R. Scott, as well as a writer of picture book texts. On seeing two of his paintings, she asked him if he would consider illustrating children's books. She wrote a text herself, for what became Bumble Bugs and Elephants (1938) —"perhaps the first modern board book for babies." Hurd's next collaboration with Brown, The Runaway Bunny, has been in print continuously since its 1942 publication. Their next book, Goodnight Moon (1947), is considered classic children's literature in North America; by 1990, the total number of copies sold was more than 4 million. In 2007, the National Education Association listed Goodnight Moon as one of its "Teachers' Top 100 Books for Children". In 2012 it was ranked number four among the "Top 100 Picture Books" in a survey published by School Library Journal.

Hurd also illustrated over fifty books written by his wife Edith Thacher Hurd (a friend of Brown's) as well as a children's book written by Gertrude Stein, The World Is Round. Hurd wrote and illustrated the book Run, Run, Run.

Hurd died of Alzheimer's disease at a San Francisco hospital in 1988.

Personal life
His son Thacher Hurd is also a children's book author and illustrator, and referred in an interview to the "wonderful aura of creativity" surrounding his father and the Vermont farm that was their home.

Legacy 
A doctored/altered photo of Hurd was included in the 60th anniversary republication of Goodnight Moon with a cigarette removed from his hand, an incident of tobacco bowdlerization that caused controversy over publication standards.

Hurd's work, as well as that of his wife and son, were featured at the Stamford Museum & Nature Center in the 2004 exhibition "From Goodnight Moon to Art Dog: The World of Clement, Edith and Thatcher Hurd."

Selected works

 The World Is Round (New York: W. R. Scott, 1939), words by Gertrude Stein, 
 The Merry Chase (Random House, 1941)
The Race Between the Monkey and the Duck (Wonder Books, 1946)
 Run Run Run: Story of Black Cat and Dog (Harper, 1951), 
 Margaret Wise Brown
 Bumble Bugs and Elephants (W. R. Scott, 1938)
 The Runaway Bunny (Harper, 1942)
 Goodnight Moon (Harper, 1947)
 My World (Harper, 1949), Brown – a Goodnight Moon book
 Good-night Moon Room (Harper, 1984) — pop-up book version
 Goodnight Moon's 123: A Counting Book (HarperCollins, 2007)
 Goodnight Moon's ABC: An Alphabet Book (HarperCollins, 2010)
 Edith Thacher Hurd
 Benny the Bulldozer (Lothrop, Lee & Shepard Co., 1947)
 Little Brass Band (Harper, 1955)
 Windy and the Willow Whistle (Sterling, 1956)
 Mr. Charlie, the Fireman's Friend (Lippincott, 1958)
 Last One Home is a Green Pig (Harper, 1959)
 Hurry Hurry (Harper, 1960)
 Come and Have Fun (Harper, 1962)
 Christmas Eve (Harper, 1962)
 No Funny Business (Harper, 1962)
 The Day the Sun Danced (Harper, 1965)
 Johnny Lion's Book (Harper, 1965)
 What Whale? Where? (Harper, 1966)
 The Blue Heron Tree (Viking, 1968)
 This is the Forest (Coward-McCann, 1969)
 Catfish (Viking, 1970)
 Johnny Lion's Bad Day (Harper, 1970)
 Wilson's World (Harper, 1971)
 Johnny Lion's Rubber Boots (Harper, 1972)
 The Mother Owl (Little, Brown, 1974)
 The Mother Kangaroo (Little, Brown, 1976)
 Look for a Bird (Harper, 1977)
 The Mother Chimpanzee (Little, Brown, 1978)
 Under the Lemon Tree (Little, Brown, 1980)

References

External links 

 Clement Hurd Papers at Children's Literature Research Collection, University of Minnesota
 

1908 births
1988 deaths
American children's book illustrators
St. Paul's School (New Hampshire) alumni
Deaths from Alzheimer's disease
Deaths from dementia in California
Yale University alumni
Writers from New York City
Writers from Vermont